Ricardo Rivadeneira Monreal (born 14 June 1929−13 June 2011) was a Chilean politician.

He was the first president of Renovación Nacional.

References

External links
 Historia Política BCN

1929 births
2011 deaths
20th-century Chilean lawyers
Pontifical Catholic University of Chile alumni
Complutense University of Madrid alumni
National Renewal (Chile) politicians